Oral gospel traditions is the hypothetical first stage in the formation of the written gospels as information was passed by word of mouth. These oral traditions included different types of stories about Jesus. For example, people told anecdotes about Jesus healing the sick and debating with his opponents. The traditions also included sayings attributed to Jesus, such as parables and teachings on various subjects which, along with other sayings, formed the oral gospel tradition. The supposition of such traditions have been the focus of scholars such as Bart Ehrman, James Dunn, and Richard Bauckham, although each scholar varies widely in his conclusions, with Ehrman and Bauckham publicly debating on the subject.

Critical methods: source and form criticism

Biblical scholars use a variety of critical methodologies known as biblical criticism. They apply source criticism to identify the written sources beneath the canonical gospels. Scholars generally understood that these written sources must have had a prehistory as oral tellings, but the very nature of oral transmission seemed to rule out the possibility of recovering them. However, in the early 20th century the German scholar Hermann Gunkel demonstrated a new critical method, form criticism, which he believed could discover traces of oral tradition in written texts. Gunkel specialized in Old Testament studies, but other scholars soon adopted and adapted his methods to the study of the New Testament.

The essence of form criticism is the identification of the Sitz im Leben, "situation in life", which gave rise to a particular written passage. When form critics discuss oral traditions about Jesus, they theorize about the particular social situation in which different accounts of Jesus were told. For New Testament scholars, this focus remains the Second Temple period. It needs be remembered that the first century Palestine of Jesus was predominantly an oral society.

A modern consensus exists that Jesus must be understood as a Jew in a Jewish environment. According to scholar Bart D. Ehrman, Jesus was so very firmly rooted in his own time and place as a first-century Palestinian Jew – with his ancient Jewish comprehension of the world, and God – that he does not translate easily into a modern idiom. Ehrman stresses that Jesus was raised in a Jewish household in the Jewish hamlet of Nazareth. He was brought up in a Jewish culture, accepted Jewish ways and eventually became a Jewish teacher, who, like other Jewish teachers of his time, debated the Law of Moses orally. Early Christians sustained these teachings of Jesus orally. Rabbis or teachers in every generation were raised and trained to deliver this oral tradition accurately. It consisted of two parts: the Jesus tradition (i.e., logia or sayings of Jesus) and inspired opinion. The distinction is one of authority: where the earthly Jesus has spoken on a subject, that word is to be regarded as an instruction or command.

The accuracy of the oral gospel tradition was insured by the community designating certain learned individuals to bear the main responsibility for retaining the gospel message of Jesus. The prominence of teachers in the earliest communities such as the Jerusalem Church is best explained by the communities' reliance on them as repositories of oral tradition.  One of the most striking features to emerge from recent study is the "amazing consistency" of the history of the tradition "which gave birth to the NT".

A review of Richard Bauckham's book Jesus and the Eyewitnesses: The Gospels as Eyewitness Testimony states "The common wisdom in the academy is that stories and sayings of Jesus circulated for decades, undergoing countless retellings and embellishments before being finally set down in writing."

Oral traditions and the formation of the gospels
Modern scholars have concluded that the Canonical Gospels went through four stages in their formation:

 The first stage was oral, and included various stories about Jesus such as healing the sick, or debating with opponents, as well as parables and teachings.
 In the second stage, the oral traditions began to be written down in collections (collections of miracles, collections of sayings, etc.), while the oral traditions continued to circulate
 In the third stage, early Christians began combining the written collections and oral traditions into what might be called "proto-gospels" – hence Luke's reference to the existence of "many" earlier narratives about Jesus
 In the fourth stage, the authors of our four Gospels drew on these proto-gospels, collections, and still-circulating oral traditions to produce the gospels of Matthew, Mark, Luke and John.

Mark, Matthew and Luke are known as the Synoptic Gospels because they are so highly interdependent. Since the twentieth century, scholars have generally agreed that Mark was the first of the gospels to be written (see Marcan priority). The author does not seem to have used extensive written sources, but rather to have woven together small collections and individual traditions into a coherent presentation. It is generally, though not universally, agreed that the authors of Matthew and Luke used as sources the gospel of Mark and a collection of sayings called the Q source. These two together account for the bulk of each of Matthew and Luke, with the remainder made up of smaller amounts of source material unique to each, called the M source for Matthew and the L source for Luke, which may have been a mix of written and oral material (see Two-source hypothesis). Most scholars believe that the author of John's gospel used oral and written sources different from those available to the Synoptic authors – a "signs" source, a "revelatory discourse" source, and others – although there are indications that a later editor of this gospel may have used Mark and Luke.

Oral transmission may also be seen as a different approach to understanding the Synoptic Gospels in New Testament scholarship. Current theories attempt to link the three synoptic gospels together through a common textual tradition.  However, many problems arise when linking these three texts together (see the Synoptic problem). This has led many scholars to hypothesize the existence of a fourth document from which Matthew and Luke drew upon independently of each other (for example, the Q source). The Oral Transmission hypothesis based on the oral tradition steps away from this model, proposing instead that this common, shared tradition was transmitted orally rather than through a lost document.

Notes

Bibliography

Further reading

External links 

 

1st-century Christianity
Oral tradition